Paul Milstein (May 12, 1922 – August 9, 2010) was an American real estate developer and philanthropist.

Early life and education
Milstein was born to a Jewish family in Manhattan and raised in the Bronx. In 1919, his father Morris Milstein, an immigrant from Russia and who started out as a floor scraper, founded the Circle Floor Company, Inc., a wood flooring company, and later, the Mastic Tile Company, a vinyl flooring company.

Milstein attended DeWitt Clinton High School and New York University for two years before joining the U.S. Army during World War II where he served in the Army Signal Corps in Missouri. After the war, he returned to the family business eventually become president of the wood flooring side of the company while his brother Seymour Milstein served as president of the vinyl flooring side of the business. Circle Floor expanded into floor tiles, acoustical ceilings, and drywall construction and won contracts to install flooring in several New York landmarks including Rockefeller Center, the United Nations Building, and both John F Kennedy Airport and LaGuardia Airport. Their company was acquired by Kinney Services Coproration in 1964, with the Milsteins remaining as managers of the unit until 1971 before sale.

Career

Milstein launched the family's first real estate development projects in the 1950s in partnership with his brother Seymour.   Their companies, Milstein Brothers (MB) Real Estate and Milford Management, manage the organization's residential and commercial space. The family made its mark in Manhattan as Paul Milstein saw and seized the potential in numerous transitional neighborhoods. Paul and his sons, Howard and Edward, invested in large-scale building projects that catalyzed growth, development and revival.

In 1989, the Milstein family acquired Douglas Elliman-Gibbons & Ives residential real estate brokerage. At the time of purchase Douglas Elliman had 10% of the New York City brokerage and managed 15,000 apartments. Howard Milstein served as Chairman for ten years and built the brand, which holds 40% of the brokerage market and managing 50,000 apartments.

In 1986, the Milsteins acquired the Emigrant Savings Bank, which they built into the largest privately owned bank in the country. In 2004, the Milsteins founded the New York Private Bank & Trust which targets high wealth families.

Philanthropy
Paul Milstein and his wife Irma established The Paul and Irma Milstein Foundation in 1994  to lead much of their philanthropic work. They have given money to New York institutions including the Milstein Hospital Building at NewYork–Presbyterian Hospital; the Milstein Hall of Ocean Life  and the Milstein Hall of Large Mammals at The American Museum of Natural History; the Paul Milstein Pool and Terrace at Lincoln Center; and the Milstein Division of U.S. History, Local History, and Genealogy at the New York Public Library.

Starting in the 1970s, the Milsteins provided capital to support medical research.  In addition to the Milstein Hospital Building (1988), they funded the Milstein Institute for Surgical Science and the Milstein Laboratories (1992–1993) to conduct research in Alzheimer's Disease, diabetes and cancer. The Milstein family is also providing support to the National Cancer Institute of the National Institutes of Health and Rockefeller University, with the Milstein Medical Research Program.

Paul and Irma Milstein have given to the Jewish Theological Seminary and JASA (Jewish Association for Services for the Aged). They sponsored the Milstein Family Jewish Communal Archive Project for the YIVO Institute at the Center for Jewish History and established the Milstein sanctuary at Temple Israel in Westchester County.

The Milstein family have been donors at Hadassah Medical Center in Jerusalem, naming the Paul and Irma Milstein Heart Institute at the Sarah Wetsman Davidson Tower.

Irma Milstein gave money to Cornell University and the Cornell University College of Architecture, Art, and Planning for Paul Milstein Hall which is used by the university's undergraduate architecture program. Construction started in 2009. The Milsteins are parents and grandparents of several students and alumni at Cornell.

The Paul Milstein Center for Real Estate is used for Columbia Business School's real estate MBA program. Established in 2001, the Milstein Center is used for real estate education at Columbia Business School with a focus on capital markets, entrepreneurship, and global business. Irma Milstein has provided support to Bank Street College of Education, one of the premier teacher training institutions in the U.S.

Personal life
Milstein was married to Irma Cameron. Irma Cameron Milstein died on March 12, 2021, in New York City, New York, at the age of 95.   They had four children:
Roslyn Milstein Meyer
Howard P. Milstein
Barbara Milstein Zalaznick
Edward L. Milstein.

Milstein died on August 9, 2010, in Manhattan.

References

1922 births
2010 deaths
American bankers
American billionaires
American construction businesspeople
American people of Russian-Jewish descent
American real estate businesspeople
Businesspeople from New York City
Cornell University people
Jewish American philanthropists
New York University alumni
DeWitt Clinton High School alumni
Philanthropists from New York (state)
20th-century American businesspeople
20th-century American philanthropists
21st-century American Jews